Thornton railway station was a station on the Keighley-Queensbury section of the Queensbury Lines which ran between Keighley, Bradford and Halifax via Queensbury. The station served the village of Thornton, West Yorkshire, England from 1878 to 1955.

The station had an island platform and was very close to the  20 arch Thornton viaduct which spans the Pinch Beck valley. It opened for passengers in 1878 and closed in 1955.
The viaduct, closed off for many years, was reopened in 2008 as part of the Great Northern Walking Trail after it had been safety checked and the former railway bed was sealed. No other parts of the former large station building remain. The site is occupied by Thornton Primary School (previously Royd Mount Middle School) since 1977. The original goods platform and a large retaining wall are still visible and have been incorporated into the school's grounds design. The viaduct is a grade II listed building, and is unusual in that it has an 'S' shape to accommodate the natural contours of the valley. It is in a picturesque location that has remained unchanged since its construction. The final trip by train over the viaduct was in 1966, by a goods train.

This is on display at the Industrial Museum at Eccleshill on the outskirts of the city of Bradford.

Photographs

References

External links
Thornton station on navigable 1947 O. S. map
Thornton station on Disused-Stations website

Disused railway stations in Bradford
Former Great Northern Railway stations
Railway stations in Great Britain opened in 1878
Railway stations in Great Britain closed in 1955